Russische Lieder is Niemen's Russian-language album, recorded in 1973 and released in West Germany by CBS (European section of Columbia Records).  The album contains traditional Russian songs.

Track listing 
 "Stiep da stiep krugom" – 4:19
 "Ty pojdi moja korowuszka damoj" – 1:30
 "Odnozwuczno gremit kolokolczik" – 3:44
 "Wychozu odin ja na dorogu" – 5:24
 "Joloczki sosionoczki" – 2:10
 "Cziornyje browi, karyje oczi" – 4:10
 "Kolybielnaja" – 3:57
 "Raskinulos morie sziroko" – 2:00
 "Po dikim stepiam Zabajkalia" – 3:15
 "Slawnoje morie, swiaszczennyj Bajkal" – 3:39

Personnel 
 Czesław Niemen – vocal, guitar, bass, piano

Czesław Niemen albums
1973 albums
Folk rock albums by Polish artists